Valdelício Macanga Maia Joaquim, nicknamed Vander, (born April 15, 1990), is an Angolan basketball player. Valdelício, a 6 ft 9 / 240 lb Center, has competed for Angola at the 2011 and 2013 Afrobaskets.

BAL career statistics

|-
|style="text-align:left;"|2021
|style="text-align:left;"|Petro de Luanda
| 6 || 5 || 18.8 || .556 || .579 || .800 || 3.7 || .8 || .5 || .3 || 9.2
|-
|style="text-align:left;"|2022
|style="text-align:left;"|Petro de Luanda
| 5 || 0 || 13.3 || .345 || .267 || – || 4.4 || .4 || .6 || .6 || 4.8
|- class="sortbottom"
| style="text-align:center;" colspan="2"|Career
| 11 || 5 || 16.3 || .460 || .437 || .800 || 4.0 || .6 || .5 || .4 || 7.2

References

External links
Hawaii Athletics profile
RealGM profile
7M profile
Warriors 2013 Roster

1990 births
Living people
2014 FIBA Basketball World Cup players
2019 FIBA Basketball World Cup players
Angolan expatriate basketball people in Argentina
Angolan expatriate basketball people in France
Angolan expatriate basketball people in the United States
Angolan men's basketball players
STB Le Havre players
Atlético Petróleos de Luanda basketball players
C.R.D. Libolo basketball players
Centers (basketball)
Hawaii Rainbow Warriors basketball players
Obras Sanitarias basketball players
Basketball players from Luanda
UJAP Quimper 29 players
Utah State Eastern Golden Eagles men's basketball players